The 2016 Mary Hardin–Baylor Crusaders football team was an American football team that represented the University of Mary Hardin–Baylor in the American Southwest Conference (ASC) during the 2016 NCAA Division III football season. In their 20th year under head coach Pete Fredenburg, the team compiled a 15–0 record (6–0 against conference opponents) and won the ASC championship. The team advanced to the NCAA Division III playoffs and defeated , 10–7, in the 2016 Stagg Bowl. As a result of rules violations self-reported by Mary Hardin–Baylor, the NCAA later vacated 13 of the team's victories and its national title.

The team played its home games at Crusader Stadium in Belton, Texas.

Schedule

References

Mary Hardin-Baylor
Mary Hardin–Baylor Crusaders football seasons
NCAA Division III Football Champions
Mary Hardin–Baylor Crusaders football